Two (stylized ) was an English/American industrial metal band, formed by former Judas Priest lead singer Rob Halford after the break-up of his previous band Fight.

Biography 
Halford and guitarist John 5 formed the band in 1996 under the name Gimp and would record an album's worth of demos. While attending Mardi Gras in New Orleans, Halford met Trent Reznor and presented him a copy of the material, which in return, Reznor stepped in as producer and released it under his Nothing Records label. Upon discovering that another band was using the Gimp name, the group was redubbed 2wo. In March 1998, the album Voyeurs was released. It sold poorly and was not well received. After a headlining tour, 2wo disbanded and John 5 would join Marilyn Manson. Halford initially began demos for a follow-up album, but eventually called the band quits and would use the material for his next band Halford.

Discography

Studio albums

Singles

Videography 
Halford hired porn director Chi Chi Larue to direct the video for the first single, "I Am a Pig". This video featured grainy S&M scenes of the band and various porn stars, including a few brief glimpses of Janine Lindemulder, in a sex dungeon. It also incorporates some of the album's artwork into the concept. It was not widely shown because of its content, but was not banned.

References

External links 
NY Rock interview with Rob Halford
 

Musical groups established in 1996
Musical groups disestablished in 1998
Nothing Records artists
English heavy metal musical groups
British industrial music groups
Musical quintets
1996 establishments in England
1998 disestablishments in England